Southern Pacific 4449, also known as the Daylight, is the only surviving example of Southern Pacific Railroad's "GS-4" class of 4-8-4 "Northern"  type steam locomotives and one of only two GS-class locomotives surviving, the other being "GS-6" 4460 at the National Museum of Transportation in St. Louis, Missouri. GS is an abbreviation of "General Service" or "Golden State," a nickname for California (where the locomotive was operated in regular service).

The locomotive was built by Lima Locomotive Works in Lima, Ohio for the Southern Pacific in May 1941; it received the red-and-orange "Daylight" paint scheme for the passenger trains of the same name which it hauled for most of its service career. No. 4449 was retired from revenue service in 1956 and put into storage. In 1958, the Southern Pacific donated the locomotive to the City of Portland, Oregon. The City then put the locomotive on static display in Oaks Amusement Park, where it remained until 1974.

After this, No. 4449 was then restored to operation for use in the American Freedom Train, which toured the 48 contiguous United States as part of the nation's 1976 Bicentennial celebration. The locomotive has operated in excursion service throughout that area since 1984.

The locomotive's operations are based at the Oregon Rail Heritage Center in Portland, Oregon where it is maintained by a group of volunteers named the Friends of SP 4449. In 1983, a poll of Trains magazine readers selected 4449 as being the most popular locomotive in the United States.

Revenue service
No. 4449 was the last steam engine manufactured in Southern Pacific's first order of GS-4 (Golden State/General Service) locomotives. No. 4449 was placed into service on May 30, 1941, and spent its early career assigned to the Coast Daylight, Southern Pacific's premier passenger train between San Francisco and Los Angeles, California, but it also pulled many other of the SP's named passenger trains.

After the arrival of newer GS-4s and GS-5s, No. 4449 was assigned to Golden State Route and Sunset Route passenger trains. 4449 was reassigned to the Coast Division in the early 1950s.

One of 4449's career highlights occurred on October 17, 1954, when SP 4449 and sister Southern Pacific 4447 pulled a special 10-car train for the Railway and Locomotive Historical Society from Los Angeles to Owenyo, California, and return. In late 1955, after being one of the last few Daylight steam engines in Daylight livery, No. 4449 was painted black and silver and its side skirting (a streamlining feature of the Daylight steam engines) was removed due to dieselization of the Coast Daylight in January of that year.

No. 4449 was then assigned to Southern Pacific's San Joaquin Valley line, occasionally pulling passenger trains such as the San Joaquin Daylight between Oakland and Bakersfield as well as fast freight and helper service. No. 4449 was semi-retired from service on September 24, 1956, and was kept as an emergency back-up locomotive until it was officially retired on October 2, 1957, and was placed in storage along with several other GS-class engines near Southern Pacific's Bakersfield roundhouse.

On display
In 1958, when most of the GS class engines had already been scrapped, a then black-and-silver painted No. 4449 was removed from storage and donated on April 24, 1958, to the City of Portland, Oregon, where it was placed on outdoor public display in Oaks Park. Since the equipment was considered obsolete, No. 4449 was not actively chosen for static display. It was picked only because it was the first in the dead line and could be removed with the fewest switching moves.

While on display, No. 4449 was repeatedly vandalized and had many of its external parts stolen, including its builder's plates and whistle. As a result, the locomotive quickly deteriorated. However, Jack Holst, a Southern Pacific employee, looked after SP No. 4449 along with two other steam locomotives, Spokane, Portland and Seattle 700 and Oregon Railroad and Navigation 197. Holst kept the engines' bearings and rods oiled in case they were ever to move again. Holst died in 1972 and did not get to see No. 4449 return to operation.

American Freedom Train
In 1974, No. 4449 was evaluated for restoration after becoming a candidate to pull the American Freedom Train, as its size, power and streamlining made it a good fit for that Bicentennial train. After the evaluators determined that 4449's bearings and rods remained in good condition, they selected the locomotive for that task.

No. 4449 was removed from display on December 13, 1974 and restored at the Burlington Northern Railroad's Hoyt Street roundhouse in Portland. The locomotive returned to operation on April 21, 1975 wearing a special paint scheme of red, white and blue.

Because the original whistle was stolen, two replacement whistles were fitted to the locomotive: a Hancock 3 chime from a Spokane, Portland and Seattle Railway Challenger on the driver's side, and a second Hancock 3 Chime off of another Daylight Locomotive, on the fireman's side. The latter would eventually be swapped out for a Southern Pacific 6 Chime. Both whistles used on the fireman's side came from private collectors.

As part of the American Freedom Train, the locomotive pulled a display train through most of the contiguous United States. The 4449 only pulled the Freedom Train in the Western portions of the country, whereas in the Eastern portions of the train were pulled by Reading 2101, which had recently been restored by Ross Rowland, and in Texas the train was pulled by Texas and Pacific 610.

After the Freedom Tour ended, No. 4449 pulled an Amtrak special, the Amtrak Transcontinental Steam Excursion during 1977. After nearly two years on the road, 4449 was returned to storage in Portland, this time under protective-cover and not exposed to the elements.

1980s
In 1981, SP 4449 was returned to its original "Daylight" colors for Railfair '81 and the opening of the California State Railroad Museum in Sacramento, California with UP 8444 and UP 3985. Prior to this trip, a Southern Pacific 6 chime whistle from a Cab forward type locomotive was mounted on the fireman's side and would remain on the locomotive throughout most trips in the 1980s. In 1984, 4449 pulled an all-Daylight-painted train from Portland via Los Angeles to New Orleans, Louisiana and back, to publicize the World's Fair, with UP 8444 there too. The  round trip was the longest steam train excursion in the history of the United States. However, this trip was not flawless. On June 11, No. 4449 was approaching Del Rio, Texas, still on its way to New Orleans, when the retention plate that holds the draw-bar pin in place somehow disconnected and fell in between the ties, allowing the tender and the entire consist to uncouple, while the locomotive accelerated all by itself. Fortunately, Doyle noticed this after checking the rear-view mirror, and quickly applied the brakes. The locomotive backed-up, the fallen parts were recovered, the connections were quickly repaired, and No. 4449 and its consist proceeded to run only slightly behind schedule.

In 1986, No. 4449 went to Hollywood to appear in Tough Guys and pulled business trains for the Southern Pacific. 4449 had a notable moment in 1989 when it and another famed locomotive, Union Pacific 844, made a side-by-side entrance into Los Angeles Union Passenger Terminal in 1989 for the station's 50th-anniversary celebrations. The two locomotives then ran side by side on Santa Fe's and Southern Pacific's parallel main lines through Cajon Pass, although 4449 eventually had to stop due to a hot axle box.

Sometime between May and July 1989, the No. 4449's SP&S Hancock whistle was set aside for the SP&S 700 and a Northern Pacific Hancock 3 chime was fitted on the engineer's side. This whistle would remain on the locomotive for the next 21 years. Later that same year, 4449 would later appear in the 1990 drama film Come See the Paradise. In late 1990, the Cab Forward whistle was returned to its owner.

1990s
On April 26, 1991, No. 4449 returned to Railfair '91 in Sacramento, again with UP 844 and UP 3985 and the newly-restored Southern Pacific 2472. It attended the next year's NRHS Convention in San Jose with No. 2472 and Union Pacific 3985. On this trip, 4449 carried a member's Star Brass 5 Chime whistle off a CB&Q M-4 class Locomotive on the fireman's side.

The locomotive would return to Railfair once again in 1999, co-starring with Santa Fe 3751 and Union Pacific's 844 and 3985. This was the last time she traversed the route of the Shasta Daylight, whose tracks are now owned by the Union Pacific.

Preservation, 2000s
In 2000, No. 4449 was repainted black and silver for a Burlington Northern Santa Fe employee appreciation special. It was traditional for Southern Pacific to paint freight locomotives in black, and 4449 and other GS locomotives received this treatment when the diesels took over their passenger assignments. In the case of BNSF, a Class 1 freight carrier, No. 4449 was given old historical treatment. Following the BNSF special, the BNSF emblems were removed and "Southern Pacific Lines" was added to the tender, a reminder of when No. 4449 was repainted to black with SP lettering in late 1955.

No. 4449 was repainted into the American Freedom Train paint scheme again in early 2002, after the events of the September 11th terrorist attacks. In the fall of 2004, No. 4449 returned to the classic Daylight paint scheme, this time in its "as-delivered" appearance. It appeared in the autumn of 2004 with the then-extant Montana Rockies Rail Tours company, pulling (with a diesel helper behind it) two summer excursion trips between Sandpoint, Idaho and Billings, Montana, including stops at the Livingston Depot.  

On May 18 and May 19, 2007, SP 4449 made another appearance with UP 844 in the Pacific Northwest for the "Puget Sound Excursion", on BNSF Railway tracks from Tacoma to Everett, Washington, round-trip.

On March 24, 2009, it was announced that No. 4449 would attend Trainfestival 2009 in Owosso, Michigan from July 23–26 with an all-day excursion planned on the 23rd and 24th and a photo run-by planned for each trip. The engine was then placed on display for the rest of the event.

The historic 2,500-mile move from Portland to Owosso was arranged by the Friends of the 4449, Amtrak, Steam Railroading Institute of Owosso and the Friends of the 261. The Milwaukee Road 261 organization loaned some of its first-class passenger cars, including the former Milwaukee Road Super Dome #53 and the Cedar Rapids Skytop Lounge to join the 4449 and for other excursion trains at the festival.

The train left its home at Brooklyn Roundhouse on July 2 and left the city of Portland the following day, on July 3. It returned to the city of Portland and Brooklyn Roundhouse on October 20. In December 2010, No. 4449's whistle, greatly worn from years of use with only one chime working properly, was replaced with an authentic SP Flat-Top Hancock 3-chime whistle from another Daylight Locomotive. This whistle remains on the locomotive to this day.

Following a two-year hiatus needed to accommodate the locomotive's mandatory 15-year inspection and overhaul, SP 4449 returned to service on November 25, 2015. From 2016 to 2019, SP 4449 pulled several excursion trains during each year. In late 2019, the locomotive was scheduled to haul the annual 40-minute round-trip "Holiday Express" fundraiser trains through Portland's Oaks Bottom Wildlife Refuge, along the Willamette River, during November and December of that year.

Due to its long rigid wheelbase and heavy weight, which were determined to cause excessive wear to the Oregon Pacific Railroad tracks being used, the engine no longer pulls the annual Oaks Park Holiday Express trains, and another locomotive was substituted in 2022 for the foreseeable future. As of 2022, 4449 is most  commonly housed inside the Oregon Rail Heritage Center, only fired up on occasion.

Preservation and maintenance
4449 is maintained by Doyle McCormack, a retired Union Pacific engineer and locomotive collector, along with many other volunteers. From 1981 to 2012, No. 4449 resided at Union Pacific's (formerly Southern Pacific) Brooklyn roundhouse in Portland, along with several other historic steam and diesel locomotives. The Oregon Rail Heritage Foundation, a partnership of non-profit organizations that owned or maintained historic rolling stock at the roundhouse, began a campaign in late 2009 to construct a permanent, publicly-accessible engine house for the City of Portland's steam locomotives.

Upon the closing of the Brooklyn Roundhouse in June 2012, in order to make the yard larger, the 4449 was moved with its stablemates SP&S 700 and OR&N 197 to the Oregon Rail Heritage Center (ORHC), a new restoration facility and public interpretive center adjacent to the Oregon Museum of Science and Industry (OMSI) in southeast Portland. The ORHC opened to the public on September 22, 2012.

Other surviving locomotives
Only one other true Southern Pacific GS-class steam engine survives: Southern Pacific 4460, a GS-6, which is on static display at the National Museum of Transportation in St. Louis, Missouri. It was built during World War II, The GS-6 locomotives were never painted in the Daylight scheme, and were nicknamed "War Babies" and "Black Daylights." In preservation, 4460 has been referred to as the "Forgotten Daylight," due to her not running since the 1950s.

Film appearances
 4449 pulled the Gold Coast Flyer train for Tough Guys, a 1986 film starring Kirk Douglas and Burt Lancaster. The creators built a full-size wooden replica of the locomotive for the crash scene.
 4449's Daylight skirts (flat side panels) were removed again for its appearance in Come See the Paradise, a 1990 World War II film directed by Alan Parker.
4449 has been fitted with an IMAX camera in 2018, to be filmed for the upcoming IMAX film Train Time.

Gallery

References

  (republished 2002)

External links

 Friends of SP 4449
 Oregon Rail Heritage Foundation
 Restoration of 4449 and the 1975-1976 Bicentennial American Freedom Train
 Southern Pacific Coast Daylight Engines

4449
Individual locomotives of the United States
4-8-4 locomotives
Lima locomotives
Rail transportation in Oregon
Transportation in Portland, Oregon
Railway locomotives introduced in 1941
Standard gauge locomotives of the United States
Preserved steam locomotives of Oregon